Tobias Lennart Billström (born 27 December 1973) is a Swedish politician of the Moderate Party. He has served as Minister for Foreign Affairs in the cabinet of Ulf Kristersson since 18 October 2022 and has been Member of the Riksdag since the 2002 general election, representing Malmö Municipality (2002–2022) and Stockholm County (since 2022).

He previously served as Minister for Migration and Asylum Policy from 2006 to 2014 and briefly as Minister for Employment in 2010 in the cabinet of Fredrik Reinfeldt. He served as First Deputy Speaker of the Riksdag from 2014 to 2017.

Education 
Billström has a Master of Philosophy in Historical Studies from the University of Cambridge and a fil. mag. in history from the University of Lund. His essays in history concerned subject areas of British colonial history, especially officers stationed in India and Jamaica. Billström became politically active through the Moderate Youth League. During his studies, he was active in the Confederation of Swedish Conservative and Liberal Students as chairman of Malmö Association FMS Gryphus, and sat on the board of the student union Lunds humanistkår. Billström began his studies in Lund in the Philosophy Department, where he read 20 points scientific basics for Victoria Höög.

Member of the Riksdag 
Billström became a Member of the Riksdag at the 2002 Swedish general election; he subsequently became a deputy in the Education Committee, Employment Committee and in the Cultural Committee. In 2003, he became a member of the Education Committee where he received a special responsibility for issues related to higher education and research. In April 2005, Billström became a member of the Social Security Committee and Moderate Party spokesperson on issues related to migration and integration. During the period from 2003 to 2007, Billström was Chairman of the Moderate Party in Malmö. Billström became a member of the board of the Swedish Migration Board in November 2005, a position he left when he was appointed Minister in 2006.

Billström participated as a Member of the Riksdag in the discussion of migration policy. He opposed the temporary asylum law that was implemented by the social democratic Persson cabinet, arguing that the law was not fair and that it was based on collective judgment.

Minister for Migration and Asylum Policy 
Billström became Minister for Migration and Asylum Policy on 6 October 2006. Billström was stationed in the Ministry of Justice, unlike his immediate predecessors, who had been stationed in the Ministry for Foreign Affairs.

Labour immigration 
Once it took office in October 2006, the Reinfeldt Cabinet set a new aim for Swedish migration policy, which was to increase the opportunities for labour immigration. Billström emphasised the importance of creating a balance in the policy area where asylum issues often dominate. He also pointed out that labour immigration today is a way to help developing countries beyond the traditional aid.

Re-establishment support 
The government implemented, on 1 August 2007, a re-establishment support to facilitate the repatriation of those who have had their asylum applications rejected.

Middle East 
Billström stated that countries in Europe and the world should help refugees from Iraq. He emphasised the need for a very strong common asylum and migration policy, and that this could give more Iraqis in need of protection to access this.

The work was given a start with the article that Billström wrote with Cecilia Malmström in the Swedish newspaper Svenska Dagbladet. The message has since been represented to the Council of the European Union and at several international conferences where Billström represented Sweden, including in Geneva and in Sharm el-Sheikh.

From 30 March until 4 April 2007, Billström, as the first European Minister for Migration and Asylum Policy, made a trip to Syria and Jordan to create a picture of the situation of the Iraqi refugees residing there. At the time he was interviewed in Damascus by Sveriges Radio.

In classified documents revealed by Wikileaks, Billström, together with Carl Bildt during the two men's visit to the American Ambassador Ryan Crocker in Baghdad in 2007, reported the Iraqi refugee situation in Sweden, specifically mentioning honour killings and the Swedish opinion of restricting immigration.

Controversial statements 
In an interview about illegal immigrants hidden in Sweden on 18 March 2013, Billström said that "Sometimes we have the impression that the person who is hidden lives with a nice blonde Swedish lady in her fifties or sixties who wants to help. But that's not true. The vast majority [of hidden illegal immigrants] live with their compatriots who are not blond and blue-eyed."

The statement was severely criticised by both opposition parties as well as the other governing parties in the Alliance coalition government. The leader of the Moderate Youth League, youth league of the Moderate Party, Erik Bengtzboe also criticised the statement, and called for Billström to apologise and to think about what he had said.

Some even called for Billström's resignation from the position of Minister for Migration and Asylum Policy. The right-wing Sweden Democrats party leader Jimmie Åkesson welcomed Billström's statement and said "that he was on the right track".

In the early afternoon on the same day, Billström officially apologised for his statement and said that his words came out in the wrong way, and that what he said was not what he really meant. Fredrik Reinfeldt, the Prime Minister of Sweden, welcomed Billström's apology.

First Deputy Speaker 
Billström was elected First Deputy Speaker on 29 September 2014. He resigned from the position in October 2017, to become Moderate Party leader in the Riksdag.

Minister for Foreign Affairs (2022-present)
On 18 October 2022, he was announced as Minister of Foreign Affairs in the Kristersson Cabinet. On his first day Billström stated that he would not use the term "feminist foreign policy" as his predecessor.

List of international trips made by Tobias Billström 
Since becoming Minister for Foreign Affairs, Billström has made a number of international trips.

Other activities 
 Migration Policy Institute (MPI), Member of the Transatlantic Council on Migration
 Wilfried Martens Centre for European Studies, Member of the Executive Board

Personal life 
He is the first openly bisexual person to serve as minister in a Swedish cabinet. He is married to Sofia Åkerman with whom he has one daughter.

TV license controversy 

On 11 October 2006, less than a week after he took office, it was revealed that Billström deliberately had neglected to pay his television licence for ten years, despite owning a television. Billström stated that his neglect was based on his political standpoint against public service, but that he had come to appreciate public service and that he believed that citizens and especially legislators should follow the law. Billström also expressed his ambition to repay his debt with interest. However, on 12 October 2006, Radiotjänst i Kiruna AB, a private agency tasked with collecting the license fees, filed criminal charges against Billström together with two other ministers in the Reinfeldt Cabinet: Cecilia Stegö Chilò and Maria Borelius, with the latter two resigning on 14 and 16 October 2006. Billström stated that he intended to remain in office and had no intention of resigning.

References

External links 

  
 Tobias Billström at the Government Offices website 
 Tobias Billström at the Riksdag website 
 Billström's blog (inactive) 

1973 births
Living people
Politicians from Malmö
Lund University alumni
Alumni of the University of Cambridge
Members of the Riksdag from the Moderate Party
European People's Party politicians
Swedish Ministers for Migration and Asylum Policy
Swedish Ministers for Employment
Swedish bloggers
Swedish LGBT politicians
Bisexual men
Bisexual politicians
Members of the Riksdag 2002–2006
LGBT legislators
Members of the Riksdag 2006–2010
Members of the Riksdag 2010–2014
Members of the Riksdag 2014–2018
Members of the Riksdag 2018–2022
Members of the Riksdag 2022–2026
Swedish Ministers for Foreign Affairs